Pseudoanthidium rotundiventre is a species of leaf-cutting bee in the genus Pseudoanthidium, of the family Megachilidae. It is endemic to Sri Lanka.

External links
 Atlashymenoptera.net
 Academia.edu
 Itis.gov
 Discoverlife.org
 Animaldiversity.org

Megachilidae
Endemic fauna of Sri Lanka
Hymenoptera of Asia
Insects of Sri Lanka